Fraser Brown (born 12 February 1970) is an Irish sailor. He competed in the 49er event at the 2004 Summer Olympics.

References

External links
 

1970 births
Living people
Irish male sailors (sport)
Olympic sailors of Ireland
Sailors at the 2004 Summer Olympics – 49er
People from Newtownards